Jacky Cheung Hok-yau (born 10 July 1961) is a Hong Kong singer and actor. Dubbed the "God of Songs", he is regarded as one of the Four Heavenly Kings of Hong Kong pop music. Cheung is known for his technically skilled vocals, lengthy tours, and multimillion-selling albums. His successful music and acting career has made Cheung one of Hong Kong's icons. He was elected by Time Magazine as one of the "25 most influential people in the New Hong Kong". Cheung set the Guinness World record for the largest combined audience for a live act in 12 months during his "Jacky Cheung 1/2 Century World Tour", with 2,048,553 audience members.

Early life 
Jacky Cheung was born and grew up in Quarry Bay in the eastern part of Hong Kong Island. His father is from Tianjin and his mother is from Shanghai. He attended North Point Government Primary School from 1967 to 1973, and graduated from Literary College in 1978.

In 2007, Cheung revealed that the paternal side of his family are mostly seamen, including his father, paternal cousin, and older brother. His first language is Cantonese, but he also speaks Mandarin and English. He sings Cantonese, Mandarin, Japanese, Korean and modern English pop songs. Cheung is known for his rich baritone voice, but also his dramatic vibrato by rapidly moving his pronounced Adam's Apple.

Musical career 
Cheung originally started working as a reservation officer for the airline Cathay Pacific. His music career started when he won the Amateur 18-Hong Kong district singing contest in 1984 with the song "Fatherland" by Michael Kwan. He outcompeted more than 10,000 other contestants. After winning the contest, he was signed by the then Polygram Records, now Universal Music Group. Although encouraged by a bright start, he did not achieve immediate supremacy in Cantopop, then dominated by Leslie Cheung, Alan Tam, Anita Mui and Danny Chan. In 1985 he won his first two major awards together with the 1985 RTHK Top 10 Gold Songs Awards and the 1985 Jade Solid Gold Top 10 Awards.

In 1991 he released the song "Loving You More Every Day", a translated version of the Japanese Southern All Stars hit "Midsummer's Fruit". The album True Love Expression in 1992, as well as the subsequent release, Love Sparks in 1992, achieved sales of over 400,000 copies in Hong Kong alone.

His subsequent albums included 1993 Me and You and 1994 Born to be Wild. In the 1994 Billboard Music Awards in the US, he was named the most popular singer in Asia. He received numerous music awards both in Hong Kong and elsewhere, including the best-selling Chinese singer in the World Music Awards for two consecutive years in 1995 and 1996 held at Monaco. Cheung was also elected as one of the world's Top Ten Outstanding Young Persons in 1999.

Amongst his hit songs, some of his most famous were "Amour", "Just want to spend my life with you" and "Goodbye Kiss". The 1993 album The Goodbye Kiss is one of the best-selling Chinese music albums of all time, achieving more sales in Hong Kong, Taiwan and Southeast Asia than ever attained before, with more than 5 million copies sold in 1993, making him one of PolyGram's top 10 artists worldwide that year. It made him the first singer with non-Taiwanese citizenship to win Taiwan's Golden Melody Awards. The album was also instrumental in helping Cheung break into the mandopop market. Due to these great songs and albums, Cheung is generally considered to be the pre-eminent member of the Four Heavenly Kings of Cantopop. He is regarded by some sources as the best singer of the four.

In 1995, Cheung staged his record-breaking 100-show world tour titled "Yau Hok Yau", literally a pun of "friendship Jacky Cheung" reusing the same Chinese characters found in his name. The tour started with 34 shows from 8 April to 9 June at the Hong Kong Coliseum. Then the tour continued at Perth Brisbane Australia and returned to Taipei and mainland China. It then expanded to Madison Square Garden in the US, different parts of Europe, Singapore, India, Malaysia and Japan.

In 1999, he was named one of the Ten Outstanding Young Persons of the World by JCI (Junior Chamber International), a worldwide federation of young professionals and entrepreneurs. In 2000 he was awarded the Golden Needle Award by RTHK. This award, the equivalent of a lifetime achievement award, recognised outstanding contributions to the music industry. He expressed his astonishment upon receiving the award, as he was the least experienced living recipient at only 16 years, and this award was awarded to singers, producers and lyricists that are late in their careers or are semi-retired, in which he was not, but to quash any negative publicity, he clarified that according to his research, there was no stipulation of this sort.

In 2004, Cheung released Life Is Like A Dream, an album in which Jacky co-produced with long-time collaborative partner Michael Au, and Jacky composed the melody for all songs, and penned the lyrics for 3 of the songs.

Cheung won the Best Selling Cantonese Album Award at the Hong Kong IFPI Awards in 2005 with his live album, Jacky Live Performance, which he accepted in person for the first time in years. This is despite poor ticket sales for the reason that the concert was meant to be a one-night-only charity concert in nature, and Jacky attempted to sing a song by other artists for the first time. In the fast-changing scene of canto-pop, Cheung has maintained his popularity and sales power for more than 20 years after his debut, an incredible feat in Hong Kong pop music.

In 2007, Cheung staged his "Year of Jacky Cheung World Tour 2007". The tour started on 18 February 2007 at The Colosseum at Caesars Palace in Las Vegas. When the tour ended in Hong Kong on 3 February 2008 after touring 58 cities around the world, a total of 105 shows had been given, attracting more than 2 million fans. 105 became the highest number of shows in a tour by a Chinese artist, breaking the previous record of 100, which was also set by Cheung previously. In that same year, he also released a Mandopop album, By Your Side, in which he was the sole executive producer of the album for the first time after Michael Au suddenly left to further his career in Beijing.

In 2009, Cheung recorded Private Corner, his first jazz album for which he coined the phrase "Canto-jazz".  The album was produced by Andrew Tuason.  "Everyday Is Christmas", "Which Way, Robert Frost?", "Let It Go", "Lucky in Love" and "Double Trouble" were co-written by Roxanne Seeman in collaboration with Tuason, tailor-made for Cheung. "Lucky in Love" is the end-credit song of "Crossing Hennessy", Hong Kong movie starring Jacky Cheung and Tang Wei, produced by Bill Kong.  Nokia's music download service website (Ovi.com) announced that "Everyday Is Christmas" was the 10th most downloaded Christmas song in the world in 2010, joining classic hits such as Wham's "Last Christmas" and Mariah Carey's "All I Want for Christmas is You".  Cheung is the only Chinese language singer to make it into the Top Ten.

In 2010, Cheung started his "Jacky Cheung 1/2 Century World Tour". This tour started on 30 December 2010 at Shanghai, and ended in Hong Kong on 30 May 2012. For 1 year and 5 months, his tour included 5 countries 77 cities, overall 146 shows, more than 2,800,000 audiences. 146 became the highest number of shows in a one tour by Chinese artist. Previous record of 105 was also made by Jacky Cheung on his 2007–2008 World Tour. Both 2007 and 2010 World tour was led by Andrew Tuason as Cheung's Musical Director. At the beginning of that year, he also attempted new musical styles.  His new album, Private Corner, became his first ever Jazz album in Cantopop history, it also featured other non-mainstream Cantopop styles such as strings quartet, Waltz and Hymn. The special edition also featured a special glass-CD, also a first in Chinese pop history. "Double Trouble" from Private Corner was a featured produced number in the "Jacky Cheung 1/2 Century World Tour".

In "Jacky Cheung 1/2 Century World Tour", he set a Guinness World record for the largest combined audience for a live act in 12 months, with 2,048,553 audience members. During the first 12-month of the tour, was ran from 30 December 2010 to 29 December 2011, with 105 live concerts in 61 cities across China, USA, Malaysia, Singapore and Australia.

Cheung won the RTHK " Honor of Golden song 35th Anniversary Award" in the 2012 RTHK Top 10 Gold Songs Awards, as he has the greatest number of RTHK Golden Songs since the award has been started.

In 2018, he earned a new nickname of "Fugitive Bait" or "Fugitives' Krytonite" in China as his concerts attracted wanted criminals in China to purchase tickets to watch his concerts in China. He helped to bring 4 wanted criminals to be captured between April to June 2018 during Cheung's Chinese leg of the world tour. In June, two ticket scalpers were also captured. This was also part of his 233-show, "Jacky Cheung A Classic Tour" world tour, which eclipses the previous tour record. The entire tour, which lasted for 27 months with performances in 97 cities, ended on 29 January 2019 after a series of 15 concerts in Hong Kong.

Duets 
Cheung not only performs solo but often performs duets with female singers. Cheung recorded a duet with Filipino singer and Asia's Songbird Regine Velasquez for the song "In Love with You"; the song was included in her multi-platinum album Listen Without Prejudice. In 2008, Cheung and A-Mei, the popular Taiwanese singer, performed Zhu Fu ("Blessing") as a duet in a benefit concert for victims of the 2008 Sichuan earthquake. Other duet partners include:

 Priscilla Chan – "To My Dear", "A Pair of Lonely Hearts", "Love and Promise", "Being Close"
 Faye Wong – "Unusual Summer", "Love, Can't Be Given Only Once"
 Kelly Chen – "Waiting for Your Love"
 Anita Mui – "Love Is Hard"'
 Shirley Kwan – "Youngster No Love"
 Coco Lee –
 Sandy Lam –
 Vivian Chow –
 Regine Velasquez – "In Love with You"
 Cally Kwong – "Only Love Persists"
 Karen Tong – "Miss Each Other in the Wind & Rain", "Deep Love for Half a Lifetime"()
 Vivian Lai – "Long Flow, Never Rests"
 He Ruhui –
 Francesca Kao – "You're the Most Precious"
 Chen Jia Lu –,
 Gin Lee - "When the Sun Rises"

On stage musical 

In 1997, his work on the groundbreaking Cantonese Broadway-style musical Snow.Wolf.Lake was enthusiastically received by both audiences and critics. Cheung not only played the male lead, he was also the artistic director for this production. The first female leads were played by Sandy Lam in Hong Kong and Nadia Chan in Singapore. Kit Chan played the second female lead. They achieved 42 consecutive full-house performances at the gigantic Hung Hom Hong Kong Coliseum which remains the record today. In November 2004, Cheung and his concert manager, Florence Chan Suk-fan, worked on a revised Mandarin version of Snow.Wolf.Lake so as to bring it to a wider audience. The female leads this time were Evonne Hsu and Nadia Chan respectively. The market budget alone exceeded HK$15 million. The estimated budget for this revised production was HK$100 million and the show premiered on 24 December 2004 in Beijing.

Acting career 

While Cheung is better known for his singing, he has also acted in many films. He received the Best Supporting Actor award in the 8th Hong Kong Film Awards for his work in As Tears Go By (1988) as well as the Best Supporting Actor Golden Horse Award for his work in The Swordsman (1990). That same year he also collaborated with John Woo and Tony Leung in the film Bullet in the Head. He also received the Best Actor Award at the International Film Festival of India for his work in July Rhapsody (2002). His song Perhaps Love, which serves as the theme song for the 2005 award-winning film of the same name, also won the Best Song Award at the 2005 Hong Kong Film Award and the CASH Best Song Award at the 2006 CASH Gold Sail Music Awards.

In 2002, he appeared in Taiwanese mini-series Love Scar (2002) with F4 member Jerry Yan and Karen Mok, where he played Jerry Yan's older brother.

In the 2004 drama film Jiang Hu directed by Wong Ching-po, Cheung plays Lefty, the best friend and right-hand man of crime boss Hung Yan Chau (Andy Lau). The film includes several other actors from Infernal Affairs. As of 2021, he is one of a handful of Chinese singer-actors who have never starred in a television drama.

Ceremonies and spokesperson 
Cheung was named the spokesperson for Hong Kong Disneyland in 2004. He took part in a number of large-scale marketing events organised by The Walt Disney Company and Walt Disney Parks and Resorts, beginning with the hosting of a TV program, Magical World of Disneyland. He recorded a multi-lingual song for Hong Kong Disneyland, entitled One. The music video for One was filmed at Hong Kong Disneyland. He also recorded for Hong Kong Disneyland: The Grand Opening Celebration Album.

In December 2006, Cheung performed live the theme song "Together Now" at the Opening Ceremony of the 15th Asian Games in Doha, Qatar. He was introduced as "the most popular Asian performer in the world".

In 2010, Cheung and Jane Zhang the Mandarin version of the Coca-Cola Celebration Mix of K'naan's "Wavin' Flag", which was the brand's promotional anthem for the 2010 FIFA World Cup.

In 2012, Cheung sang "", the cheering song of China for the 2012 London Olympics.

Personal life 
On 15 February 1996 in London, Cheung married Hong Kong former actress May Lo Mei-mei. They met during the filming of Devoted to You in 1986. The couple have two daughters, Zoe, b. 2000, and Zia, b. 2005. He is a Buddhist and a vegetarian.

Community work 
In March 2009 he became the first Cantopop/Mandopop artist to contribute items to the Hard Rock franchise memorabilia collection. Items are to be exhibited at the Hard Rock hotel in Macau. A joint donation is also made to donate HK$600,000 to the Children's Cancer Foundation and ORBIS Macau. In September 2009, Cheung, was one of the super ambassadors of End Child Sexual Abuse Foundation (ECSAF) founded by Josephine Siao; he attended the charity fundraising event for ECSAF's 10th anniversary in Hong Kong.

Discography 

 By Your Side was awarded one of the Top 10 Selling Mandarin Albums of the Year at the 2007 IFPI Hong Kong Album Sales Awards, presented by the Hong Kong branch of IFPI.

Filmography

Awards and nominations 
IFPI Gold Disc Award
 1989 87' Polygram
 1990  Polygram

IFPI Platinum Disc Award
 1985 Smile Polygram
 1986  Polygram
 1987  Polygram
 1987 Jacky Polygram
 1988  Polygram
 1990  Polygram
 1990  Polygram
Golden Melody Award for Best Male Mandarin Singer

 1998  Polygram

IFPI Top 10 Sales Album
 2003 Where is he  What's Music
 2004 Black & White What's Music
 2005  Live  What's Music

IFPI Top 10 Sales Artist
 2005

IFPI Top Sales Album
 2005  Live  What's Music

References

Sources 
"MTV Top 10 Christmas Songs 2010"
"Ovi Music Trends Top 10 Downloaded Festive Songs"

External links 

 Official website

 

1961 births
Living people
20th-century Hong Kong male singers
20th-century Hong Kong male actors
21st-century Hong Kong male singers
21st-century Hong Kong male actors
Hong Kong Buddhists
Cantopop singers
Hong Kong Mandopop singers
English-language singers from Hong Kong
Hong Kong male film actors
Hong Kong philanthropists
Hong Kong idols